Madagascar competed at the 1984 Summer Olympics in Los Angeles, United States.

Results by event

Athletics
Men's 400 metres 
 Arsene Randriamahazoman
 Heat — 48.86 (→ did not advance)

Men's Marathon
 Jules Randrianarivelo — 2:43:05 (→ 72nd place)

References
Official Olympic Reports

Nations at the 1984 Summer Olympics
1984
Olympics